Greenfield Township is one of the thirteen townships of Fairfield County, Ohio, United States. As of the 2010 census the population was 5,565, of whom 5,027 lived in the unincorporated portions of the township.

Geography
Located in the central part of the county, it borders the following townships:
Liberty Township - north
Pleasant Township - east
Berne Township - southeast corner
Hocking Township - south
Amanda Township - southwest corner
Bloom Township - west
Violet Township - northwest corner

Parts of two municipalities are located in Greenfield Township: the city of Lancaster, the county seat of Fairfield County, in the southeast; and the village of Carroll in the northwest.

Name and history
Greenfield Township was established in 1805 and named after Greenfield Hill, a historic neighborhood in Fairfield, Connecticut, which the county was named after. Statewide, other Greenfield Townships are located in Gallia and Huron counties.

Government
The township is governed by a three-member board of trustees, who are elected in November of odd-numbered years to a four-year term beginning on the following January 1. Two are elected in the year after the presidential election and one is elected in the year before it. There is also an elected township fiscal officer, who serves a four-year term beginning on April 1 of the year after the election, which is held in November of the year before the presidential election. Vacancies in the fiscal officership or on the board of trustees are filled by the remaining trustees.

Notable residents
Jacob R. Brandt, bridge builder in the area who lived in the 1800s

References

External links
Greenfield Township official website
County website

Townships in Fairfield County, Ohio
Townships in Ohio